In enzymology, a flavanone 4-reductase is an enzyme that catalyzes the chemical reaction

(2S)-flavan-4-ol + NADP+  (2S)-flavanone + NADPH + H+

Thus, the two substrates of this enzyme are (2S)-flavan-4-ol and NADP+, whereas its 3 products are (2S)-flavanone, NADPH, and H+.

This enzyme belongs to the family of oxidoreductases, specifically those acting on the CH-OH group of donor with NAD+ or NADP+ as acceptor. The systematic name of this enzyme class is (2S)-flavan-4-ol:NADP+ 4-oxidoreductase. This enzyme participates in flavonoid biosynthesis.

References 

 

EC 1.1.1
NADPH-dependent enzymes
Enzymes of unknown structure
Flavanones metabolism